is a passenger railway station located in the city of Himeji, Hyōgo Prefecture, Japan, operated by the private Sanyo Electric Railway.

Lines

Station layout
The station consists of four bay platforms on the second floor of the station building. The station is staffed.

Platforms

Adjacent stations

|-
!colspan=5|Sanyo Electric Railway

History
It was renamed  on 20 November 1943. 

The station was burned down in 1946, and by 1954 the station was rebuilt into an elevated structure. 

It was renamed to its present name on 7 April 1991.

Passenger statistics
In fiscal 2018, the station was used by an average of 4,948 passengers daily (boarding passengers only).

Surrounding area
The station building is located close to the JR West Himeji Station on the Sanyō Main Line and Sanyō Shinkansen.
 Himeji City Hall Citizen's Bureau Mega Service Center
 Mega Castle Ruins

See also
List of railway stations in Japan

References

External links

 Official website (Sanyo Electric Railway) 

Railway stations in Japan opened in 1923
Railway stations in Himeji